Pleasant Grove High School is the name of several educational institutions, including:

Pleasant Grove High School (Alabama), Pleasant Grove, Alabama
Pleasant Grove High School (California), Elk Grove, California
Pleasant Grove High School (Utah), Pleasant Grove, Utah
Pleasant Grove High School (Texas), Texarkana, Texas
Pleasant Grove High School, a former high school in the Pleasant Grove area of Dallas, Texas, succeeded by W. W. Samuell High School in 1955

See also
 Grove High School (disambiguation)